Ancylosis interjectella is a species of snout moth in the genus Ancylosis. It was described by Émile Louis Ragonot in 1888, and is known from South Africa and Namibia.

References

Moths described in 1888
interjectella
Insects of Namibia
Moths of Africa